Eugene Michael Simon (born 11 June 1992) is an English actor. He is best known for his roles as Jerome Clarke in the Nickelodeon mystery series House of Anubis (2011–2013) and Lancel Lannister in the HBO fantasy series Game of Thrones (2011–2012; 2015–2016).

Early life and education
Simon was born in London to Anton (died 2017) and Teresa (née Stopford) Simon. He has two older brothers, Charles (born 1987) and Harry, and a younger sister, Fleur. Simon attended Downside School in Somerset and Bryanston School in Dorset. He trained at Joseph Pearlman's acting academy in Los Angeles.

Career
Around eight years old, Simon's mother signed him up for an acting agency. He began appearing in commercials before appearing in film roles as a young Gerald Durrell in My Family and Other Animals and then as a young Giacomo Casanova in Casanova in 2005.

On his eighteenth birthday, Simon received the news that he had been cast as Lancel Lannister in the HBO series Game of Thrones and as Jerome Clarke in the Nickelodeon series House of Anubis.

Simon played young Eugene Devlin in 2013 film Before I Sleep and Kennefick in the 2015 film Eden. He went on to star as Sean Nally in the 2017 Irish film The Lodgers and as the titular role in the 2018 film Kill Ben Lyk. He appeared in the 2018 production of For King and Country at Southwark Playhouse and the 2019 stage adaptation of A Room with a View at L.A. Theatre Works.

Personal life
Simon is based between London and Los Angeles. In 2019, he led acting workshops in Valletta. He has been vocal about men's mental health and suicide prevention on social media, appearing on the 2020 Well Beings Virtual National Town Hall & Panel Discussion.

Filmography

Film roles

Television roles

Stage

Awards and nominations

References

External links
 
 Resonance, a short movie by Marcos Efron and Eugene Simon

Living people
1992 births
21st-century English male actors
English male child actors
English male film actors
English male television actors
English people of Irish descent
English people of Scottish descent
Male actors from London
People educated at Bryanston School
People educated at Downside School
Stopford family